|}

The National Hunt Challenge Cup is a Grade 2 National Hunt steeplechase in Great Britain for amateur riders which is open to horses aged five years or older. It is run on the Old Course at Cheltenham over a distance of about 3 miles 6 furlongs (3 miles 5 furlongs and 201 yards, or 6,018 metres), and during its running there are twenty-three fences to be jumped. The race is for novice chasers, and it is scheduled to take place each year during the Cheltenham Festival in March.

History
Now in its  year, the National Hunt Chase has been run more times than any other event at the Cheltenham Festival. The Grand Annual is older, but that race was absent for much of the late 19th century.

During the early part of its history it was held at various venues, including its present home in 1904 and 1905. It was transferred more permanently to Cheltenham in 1911, when it became part of the new two-day National Hunt Meeting. Until the 1930s it was the second most important jumps race in the calendar after the Grand National.

At 3 miles and 7½ furlongs prior to 2020, the distance of the National Hunt Chase was longer than that of any other event at the Festival. It is now the second-longest after the Glenfarclas Cross Country Chase. The race was contested on Cheltenham's New Course from 2005 to 2007, and during this period its length was 4 miles and 1 furlong. The 2008 running was titled the Peter O'Sullevan National Hunt Chase in celebration of the 90th birthday of Peter O'Sullevan, a retired racing commentator and the 2012 running was titled the Diamond Jubilee National Hunt Chase to mark the Diamond Jubilee of Elizabeth II. The 2013 race was run as the John Oaksey National Hunt Chase in memory of John Oaksey, a notable amateur National Hunt jockey and racing journalist who died in September 2012. The National Hunt Chase was given Listed status by the British Horseracing Board from its 2014 running and included the name of former champion jockey Terry Biddlecombe, who died in January 2014, in its title. The 2015 race name commemorated trainer Toby Balding. The race was upgraded to Grade 2 status from the 2017 running.

The race distance was reduced to about 3 miles and 6 furlongs from the 2020 running after a controversy in 2019. Only four of 18 runners finished the 2019 race. Three jockeys were banned by the racecourse stewards for continuing to ride on tired horses, although the bans were subsequently overturned on appeal. The British Horseracing Authority conducted a review of the race which led to a cut in its distance and the number of fences jumped, along with some other changes relating to the eligibility of horses and jockeys to take part. Only professional jockeys competed in the 2021 running as amateur riders were excluded from the Cheltenham Festival due to restrictions on grassroots sport for the COVID-19 pandemic in the United Kingdom.

Records
Leading jockey since 1946 (4 wins):
 Patrick Mullins - Back In Focus (2013), Rathvinden (2018), Stattler (2022), Gaillard Du Mesnil (2023) 

Leading trainer since 1946 (6 wins):
 Jonjo O'Neill – Front Line (1995), Rith Dubh (2002), Sudden Shock (2003), Native Emperor (2004), Butler's Cabin (2007), Minella Rocco (2016)

Winners since 1860
 All amateur jockeys except in 2021.

See also
 Horse racing in Great Britain
 List of British National Hunt races

References

 Racing Post:

 cheltenham.co.uk – Media information pack (2010).
 pedigreequery.com – National Hunt Chase Challenge Cup – Cheltenham.
 
 History of the National Hunt Chase 1860–2010. Peter Stevens. 2010. .

National Hunt races in Great Britain
Cheltenham Racecourse
National Hunt chases
Recurring sporting events established in 1860
1860 establishments in England